Two ships of the Royal Australian Navy have been named HMAS Cessnock, after the town of Cessnock, New South Wales.

 , a Bathurst-class corvette laid down in 1941 and paid off in 1946
 , a Fremantle-class patrol boat laid down in 1981 and in service until 2005

Battle honours
Four battle honours were awarded to ships named HMAS Cessnock:
 Pacific 1942
 New Guinea 1942
 Indian Ocean 1942–45
 Sicily 1943

References

Royal Australian Navy ship names